Faisal bin Turki, GCIE (8 June 1864 – 4 October 1913), historic spelling Fessul bin Turkee, ruled as Sultan of Muscat and Oman from 4 June 1888 to 4 October 1913. He succeeded his father Turki bin Said as Sultan. Upon his death in 1913, he was succeeded by his eldest son Taimur bin Faisal.

Life
Both his mother and father's mother were Surma people of Ethiopia.

On assuming power in 1888, Faisal ibn Turki gradually found his authority over the interior weakened as tribal leaders increasingly perceived his dependence on British advisers as an inherent weakness. In 1895 he was forced to seek refuge at Jalali fort after Muscat was captured. British political agents frustrated his efforts to recapture Muscat, compelling him to court the French. He granted the French coaling facilities for their fleet at Bandar Jissah near Muscat.

Determined to thwart any growth in French presence in what Britain considered its sphere of influence, Britain presented Faisal ibn Turki with an ultimatum in 1899 ordering the sultan to board the British flagship or Muscat would be bombarded. Having little recourse, Faisal ibn Turki capitulated. Publicly humiliated, his authority was irreversibly damaged. In 1903 he asked Lord George Nathaniel Curzon, viceroy of India, for permission to abdicate, but his request was denied. Responsibility for the capital was delegated to Said ibn Muhammad Al Said, while affairs of the interior fell to an ex-slave, Sulayman ibn Suwaylim. By 1913 control over the interior was completely lost, and a reconstituted imamate was again a threat to Muscat. In May 1913, Salim ibn Rashid al Kharusi was elected imam at Tanuf and spearheaded a revolt against the sultan that combined both Hinawi and Ghafiri tribal groups.

On Faisal's death, he was succeeded by his second son, Taimur bin Faisal. Sultan Haitham of Oman is a direct descendant of Faisal bin Turki.

Family
Faisal Bin Turki had 24 children:

 Sayyid Badran bin Faisal Al-Sa’id
 Sultan Taimur bin Faisal Al-Sa'id
 Sayyid Nadir bin Faisal Al-Sa’id
 Sayyid Muhammad bin Faisal Al-Sa’id
 Sayyid Hamad bin Faisal Al-Sa’id
 Sayyid Hamud bin Faisal Al-Sa’id
 Sayyid Salim bin Faisal Al-Sa’id
 Sayyid Ali bin Faisal Al-Sa’id
 Sayyid Malik bin Faisal Al-Sa’id
 Sayyid Shihab bin Faisal Al-Sa’id
 Sayyid Abbas bin Faisal Al-Sa’id
 Sayyid Matar bin Faisal Al-Sa’id
 Sayyida … bint Faisal Al-Sa’id
 Sayyida Burda bint Faisal Al-Sa’id
 Sayyida Rahma bint Faisal Al-Sa’id
 Sayyida Ruma bint Faisal Al-Sa’id
 Sayyida Taimura bint Faisal Al-Sa’id
 Sayyida Aliya bint Faisal Al-Sa’id
 Sayyida Walyam bint Faisal Al-Sa’id
 Sayyida Shatu’ bint Faisal Al-Sa’id
 Sayyida Saraya bint Faisal Al-Sa’id
 Sayyida Taimura bint Faisal Al-Sa’id
 Sayyida Shirin bint Faisal Al-Sa’id
 Sayyida Shuruqa bint Faisal Al-Sa’id

Honours
Delhi Durbar gold medal – 1903
Honorary Knight Grand Commander of the Order of the Indian Empire (GCIE) – 1904 
Delhi Durbar gold medal – 1911
Order of the Praiseworthy, 1st Class in brilliants of the Sultanate of Zanzibar

Ancestry

References

1864 births
1913 deaths
19th-century Omani people
20th-century Omani people
Al Said dynasty
Honorary Knights Grand Commander of the Order of the Indian Empire
Omani people of Ethiopian descent
Omani Ibadi Muslims
Sons of Omani sultans
Sultans of Oman